Věra Vančurová (17 September 1932 – 6 February 2018) was a Czech gymnast who competed in the 1952 Summer Olympics, receiving a bronze medal in the team event.

Vančurová was born in Prague in September 1932. She died there on 6 February 2018, at the age of 85.

References

1932 births
2018 deaths
Czech female artistic gymnasts
Olympic gymnasts of Czechoslovakia
Gymnasts at the 1952 Summer Olympics
Olympic bronze medalists for Czechoslovakia
Olympic medalists in gymnastics
Medalists at the 1952 Summer Olympics
Gymnasts from Prague